Guru is a 1989 Indian Hindi-language film directed by Umesh Mehra, starring Nutan, Mithun Chakraborty, Sridevi and Shakti Kapoor. The film was a major commercial success. Incidentally, after 14 years, Chakraborty worked in a 2003 film of the same name in Bengali, as well as a 2007 film of the same name, 18 years later.

The film's plot is based on Kaakki Sattai starring Kamal Haasan, a 1985 Tamil hit.

Summary 
Gaurav Shankar Shrivastav aka Guru's ambition is to become an upright Police officer, but unluckily he is not getting selected. His sole strength is his lady love Rama. As Mithun's ambition fails, he turns to alcohol, dacoity, and thuggism. He finally joins Manu's lethal gang to take revenge on the Police force, which blocked his ambition. Uma (Rama's lookalike), is Vicky's important gang member. One day, Vicky gets the confidential message about an undercover cop in his Gang.

Cast 
Nutan as Yashoda Shrivastav
Mithun Chakraborty as Inspector Gaurav Shankar Shrivastav "Guru"
Sridevi as Rama / Uma (Double Role) 
Shakti Kapoor as Vicky
Roopesh Kumar as Roopesh
Amrit Pal as Manu
Bob Christo as Bob
Yunus Parvez as Inspector Manchanda
Arun Bakshi as Inspector Arun
Sameer Khakhar as Sameer
Seema Deo as Rama & Uma's Mother
Sudhir Dalvi as Police Commissioner

Crew 
Lyrics ... Anjaan & Indeevar

Soundtrack

References

External links 

1989 films
1980s Hindi-language films
Hindi remakes of Tamil films
Films scored by Bappi Lahiri
Films directed by Umesh Mehra